Gastreochrea viva is a species of enigmatic tubular organism from the Ediacaran that bared a slight resembalance to the Anabartids (lower Cambrian of age) which also bared a similar tube-like structure. It was first described by Val'kov in 1982. It is similar to and may be confused with Mariochrea sinuosa.

Affinity
J.J. Sepkoski proposed that gastreochrea should be considered as a  Trilobozoan. However, it has also been proposed to being a  Triradialomorph.

See also
 List of Ediacaran genera 
 Trilobozoa

References 

Species described in 1982
Enigmatic prehistoric animal genera
Aquatic animals
Ediacaran life
Ediacaran
Extinct species
Prehistoric animal taxa